Wolgast is a town in the district of Vorpommern-Greifswald, in Mecklenburg-Vorpommern, Germany. It is situated on the bank of the river (or strait) Peenestrom, vis-a-vis the island of Usedom on the Baltic coast that can be accessed by road and railway via a movable bascule bridge (Blaues Wunder). In December 2004, the town had a population of 12,725.

History

The precursor of present-day Wolgast was a Slavic Wendish stronghold located on an island within the Peenestrom sound. Contemporary sources called it Hologost(a), Ologost, Woligost, Woligast, Wologost, Wolegast, Wolegust, Walagost(um), Walogost(um), Waløgost(um), Waloguslum, Walagust, Walegusth, Walægust, Walgust, Wolgast, Valagust, Wołogoszcz or Valegust. Wilhelm Ferdinand Gadebusch traces the name through Wendish to mean a "large grove".  It is unclear which of the tribes documented in the area the population belonged to, the Veleti/Lutici or Rani. In 1123/24, prince Henry of the Obodrites used the stronghold as a stepping stone in his campaign against the Rani.

In 1128, after the Pomeranian duke Wartislaw I had subdued the area, the Wends were baptized by Otto of Bamberg on his second Pomeranian mission, while Wartislaw was also present in the stronghold. In this context, Wolgast was described as a opulentissima civitas by the chronicler Ebo, it is however unclear whether this should be read as meaning opulent or mighty "castle" or "town". Otto destroyed a local temple devoted to Gerowit, a god of war, and replaced it with a church. The thesis that this first church was a predecessor of today's St. Peter's church has not yet been confirmed.

Wolgast was made the seat of a Pomeranian castellany, and played an important role in the 12th-century warfare between Pomeranians, Rani and the Danes. In 1162, Wolgast was targeted by an allied Danish-Rani fleet, and temporarily had to accept Danish suzerainty. In 1164, in the context of the battle of Verchen, a Danish force under Wetheman took control of Wolgast, and left it to a mixed Rani-Pomeranian-Obrodite garrison after peace was restored. Yet, the Rani (the Danish allies) were soon expelled by the Pomeranians, and the Obodrites (also Danish allies) left the scene. The Danes attacked Wolgast again in the summer of 1167, and again either in late 1167 or in 1168, and devastated the area. In 1177, another Danish assault on Wolgast failed, but a campaign in 1179 was successful, though the Danish fleet accepted money instead of a surrender. In 1184, Wolgast was unsuccessfully besieged by the Danes, but finally came under Danish control in 1185 when the Pomeranian duke accepted Danish suzerainty. While the Danes lost control over most of Pomerania in 1227, Wolgast remained a Danish bridgehead until either 1241/43 or 1250.

On the mainland opposite to island with the castle, a new planned town was built in the course of the Ostsiedlung. It is not known when exactly this city of Wolgast was granted German town law, though its existence is confirmed by a letter written in or before 1259. The original charter was issued by both Pomeranian dukes of the time, Wartislaw III and Barnim I, and a confirmation of the Lübeck law was issued in 1282 by duke Bogislaw IV.

Wolgast was residence of the Pomeranian dukes from 1285 until the ruling House of Pomerania became extinct in 1637. Capital of Pomerania-Wolgast, a longtime inner partition of the duchy, Wolgast Castle was built as a residential palace in Renaissance style on an island hence called Castle Island. The ducal line of Pomerania-Wolgast became extinct when Philipp Julius died without issue.

During the Thirty Years' War, the Swedish Empire occupied Wolgast in 1630 and kept it as a part of Swedish Pomerania until 1815. The former ducal palace decayed, and the town was burned down in 1713 by Russian forces during the Great Northern War, in retaliation for Swedish arson in Altona. Only the church, four chapels and four more buildings were spared by the fire. Most houses of the Old Town therefore date back to the 18th and 19th centuries, the townhall was renewed after the fire in baroque style.

After the Swedish withdrawal from Pomerania in 1815, the city was integrated into the Prussian Province of Pomerania. Last remnants of the palace were removed in 1849. Wolgast prospered throughout the 19th century as a port for grain trade. In 1910 a Catholic Church was built for Polish workers 

Wolgast lost its status as a Kreis capital on 12 June 1994, when Kreis Wolgast was merged into Kreis Ostvorpommern, which became part of Vorpommern-Greifswald in 2011.

Museums

The town's history is presented in the Stadtgeschichtliches Museum (Towns' historical museum) in a building at the market place nicknamed Kaffeemühle (coffee grinder). The former house of painter Philipp Otto Runge is also a museum by now (Rungemuseum).

Notable people 

 Barnim VII, Duke of Pomerania (1390–1450) Duke of Pomerania
 Ernst Ludwig, Duke of Pomerania (1545–1592) duke of Pomerania
 Barnim X, Duke of Pomerania (1549–1603) a duke of Pomerania
 Casimir VI, Duke of Pomerania (1557–1605) a non-reigning duke of Pomerania
 Philipp Julius, Duke of Pomerania (1584–1625) duke of Pomerania
 Otto Wolgast (1640-1681) early settler in Delaware, United States and founder of the Zwaanendael Colony
 Johann Philipp Palthen (1672–1710) a Western Pomeranian historian and philologist
 Philipp Otto Runge (1777–1810) a Romantic German painter and draughtsman
 Karl Gustav Homeyer (1795–1874) a German jurist
 Adolf Friedrich Stenzler (1807–1887) a German Indologist
 Theodor Marsson (1816–1892) a German pharmacist and botanist
 Willy Stöwer (1864–1931) a German artist, illustrator and author
 Hans-Ulrich Grapenthin (born 1943) a German former footballer who played 308 games for FC Carl Zeiss Jena
 Axel Kruse (born 1967) a former German association footballer and American football player. 
 Franka Dietzsch (born 1968) a former German discus thrower
 Johannes Sellin (born 1990) a German handball player

References

Bibliography

External links
 Wolgast depiction in 1614 by Eilhard Lubinus

Towns in Mecklenburg-Western Pomerania
Port cities and towns in Germany
Port cities and towns of the Baltic Sea
Vorpommern-Greifswald
Populated coastal places in Germany (Baltic Sea)
Members of the Hanseatic League
Populated places established in the 13th century
1250s establishments in the Holy Roman Empire
1257 establishments in Europe
Burial sites of the House of Pomerania